Scotland rugby team can refer to the following -

 Scotland national rugby union team
 Scotland national women's rugby union team
 Scotland national rugby sevens team
 Scotland A national rugby union team
 Scotland national rugby league team
 Scotland A national rugby league team